Hatfields Beach, officially Ōtānerua / Hatfields Beach, is a northern coastal suburb of Auckland, in New Zealand. It is on the Hibiscus Coast Highway about 40 kilometres (by road) north of the city centre.

The Hatfield family was established in what was then called Otenerua in 1859 and the area was known at Hatfield Bay by 1870. Members of the family included John B Hatfield and his son, John Alexander Hatfield.

The Auckland Unitary Plan proposes that the block to the north of Hatfields, between State Highway 1 and the Hibiscus Coast Highway, and south of the Waiwera River, which at the time the plan was produced was a mixture of native bush and marginal farmland, be redeveloped to include clusters of rural lifestyle blocks with protected areas and a walking trail to Waiwera.

Demographics

Hatfields Beach had a population of 1,554 at the 2018 New Zealand census, an increase of 174 people (12.6%) since the 2013 census, and an increase of 360 people (30.2%) since the 2006 census. There were 558 households, comprising 768 males and 786 females, giving a sex ratio of 0.98 males per female. The median age was 40.4 years (compared with 37.4 years nationally), with 300 people (19.3%) aged under 15 years, 288 (18.5%) aged 15 to 29, 735 (47.3%) aged 30 to 64, and 225 (14.5%) aged 65 or older.

Ethnicities were 93.2% European/Pākehā, 11.6% Māori, 2.5% Pacific peoples, 3.5% Asian, and 1.4% other ethnicities. People may identify with more than one ethnicity.

The percentage of people born overseas was 29.0, compared with 27.1% nationally.

Although some people chose not to answer the census's question about religious affiliation, 58.5% had no religion, 31.7% were Christian, 0.2% had Māori religious beliefs, 0.8% were Hindu, 0.4% were Buddhist and 1.7% had other religions.

Of those at least 15 years old, 243 (19.4%) people had a bachelor's or higher degree, and 183 (14.6%) people had no formal qualifications. The median income was $41,000, compared with $31,800 nationally. 297 people (23.7%) earned over $70,000 compared to 17.2% nationally. The employment status of those at least 15 was that 699 (55.7%) people were employed full-time, 222 (17.7%) were part-time, and 27 (2.2%) were unemployed.

Notable residents
Robert Muldoon, former Prime Minister, had a bach in Hatfields Beach, built by his father in law in 1959.

Notes

Populated places in the Auckland Region
Hibiscus Coast